Robert French (born 1947) is an Australian judge.

Robert French  may also refer to:
Robert French (1716–1779), Irish politician
Robert French (English MP), English MP for Totnes
Robert P. French, American politician from Pennsylvania
Robert M. French (active since 1972), American cognitive scientist and research director at the CNRS, France
Robert French (Irish judge) (1690–1772), Irish judge
Robert French (sailor) (1918–2006), Australian Olympic sailor

See also
Robert Ffrench (born circa 1962), Jamaican reggae singer and record producer